The Masjid-i-Jehan-Numa, commonly known as the Jama Masjid of Delhi, is one of the largest mosques in India.

It was built by the Mughal emperor Shah Jahan between 1650 and 1656, and inaugurated by its first Imam, Syed Abdul Ghafoor Shah Bukhari. Situated in the Mughal capital of Shahjahanabad (today Old Delhi), it served as the imperial mosque of the Mughal emperors until the demise of the empire in 1857. The Jama Masjid was regarded as a symbolic gesture of Islamic power across India, well into the colonial era. It was also a site of political significance during several key periods of British rule. It remains in active use, and is one of Delhi's most iconic sites, closely identified with the ethos of Old Delhi.

Names 
The mosque has two names. The older one, bestowed by Shah Jahan, is 'Masjid-i-Jehān-Numā', roughly translating to "mosque commanding the view of the world" in Persian and Urdu. The other more common one is 'Jāmā Masjid', which emerged among the common populace. Its literal translation in Arabic is "congregational mosque". It is used in the sense of 'Friday mosque' (Juma Masjid), since this is when the congregational prayer is held. The term 'Jama Masjid'''  is not unique to Delhi's mosque; since the 7th century, it has been used in the Islamic world to denote the community mosque, and hence many around the world bear this name and its variants.

 Location 
The mosque is located within the historic city of Shahjahanabad, today known as the locality of Old Delhi. Across from the mosque are the Red Fort and Sunehri Masjid. As one of the focal points of Old Delhi, Jama Masjid is surrounded by various commercial centres, such as the historic Chandni Chowk. The tomb of Abul Kalam Azad, Indian independence activist, is located adjacent to the mosque.

 History 

 Construction and Mughal Era 
Mughal emperor Shah Jahan built the Jama Masjid between 1650 and 1656, at the highest point of Shahjahanabad. The mosque was designed by architect Ustad Khalil, and constructed by approximately 5000 workers.Asher, Catherine B. (1992). The New Cambridge History of India: Architecture of Mughal India. Cambridge University Press. p. 193. . The workforce was diverse, consisting of Indians, Arabs, Persians, Turks, and Europeans. The construction was supervised primarily by Sadullah Khan, the wazir (or prime minister) during Shah Jahan's reign, and Fazil Khan, the comptroller of Shah Jahan's household. The cost of the construction at the time was ten lakh (one million) rupees. The mosque was inaugurated on 23 July, 1656 by Syed Abdul Ghafoor Shah Bukhari, from Bukhara, Uzbekistan. He had been invited by Shah Jahan to be the Shahi Imam (Royal Imam) of the mosque. 

The mosque was one of the last monuments built under Shah Jahan. After its completion, it served as the royal mosque of the emperors until the end of the Mughal period. The khutba was recited by the Mughal emperor during the Friday noon prayer, legitimising his rule. The mosque was hence a symbol of Mughal sovereignty in India, carrying political significance. It was also an important centre of social life for the residents of Shahjahanabad, providing a space transcending class divide for diverse people to interact.

 British Raj 

The British took over Shahjahanabad in 1803. The Mughal Emperor remained the ritual imperial head of the mosque, but Mughal power and patronage had significantly waned. The initial policy of the British in the city was favourable towards its residents; the British undertook repairs and even renovations of the Jama Masjid. The Masjid continued to serve as a site of social and political discourse, in keeping with other mosques of Delhi at the time; for example, theological and philosophical debates were held between Muslims and Christians. 

The Revolt of 1857 was a major turning point in this situation. This event resulted in the deaths of many British people in the city, and weakened colonial authority, deeply affronting the British. It also ended the Mughal empire. The British perceived the revolt as instigated by Muslims, cultivated within Delhi's mosques. After the British reclaimed the city in the same year, they razed many mosques and banned the congregation of Muslims in any remaining mosques. The Jama Masjid fell into British confiscation during this time, and was barred from any religious use. It was repeatedly considered for destruction, but the British eventually began using it as barracks for its Sikh and European soldiers. This was a desecration of the space; Aziz characterises the decision as deliberate, in order to insult the sentiments of the city's Muslim inhabitants.

The Masjid was eventually returned to the Muslim population in 1862, due to their increasing resentment of British actions. Multiple conditions were imposed, including the usage of Jama Masjid as strictly a religious site, as well as mandatory policing by the British. The Jama Masjid Managing Committee (JMMC), consisting of respected Muslims of Delhi, was established as a formal body to represent the mosque and enforce these conditions. 

Upon its return, the Jama Masjid was reestablished as a mosque. Though the Mughal state had been dissolved, the mosque received patronage from various regional Islamic rulers and nobles. In 1886, the Nawab of Rampur donated a large sum of 1,55,000 rupees to facilitate repairs. In 1926, a donation from the Nizam of Hyderabad of 1,00,000 rupees was used for similar purposes.
Growing unrest against British rule manifested in Delhi's mosques from 1911. The Jama Masjid was frequently used for non-religious, political purposes, against the rules instituted. While the British could police and clamp down on political activities in public spaces, the Jama Masjid was a religious space and was hence protected from such action, by both law (Religious Endowment Act, 1863) and the sentiments of Delhi. Hindus often gathered with Muslims in the mosque to express anti-colonial solidarity, in spite of simmering tension between the communities in the colonial period.

 Post-Colonial Era 
The Jama Masjid continued to be a political symbol after independence. Indian independence activist Abul Kalam Azad delivered a speech from its pulpit during the Friday prayer of 23 October, 1947. The Partition of India was underway, causing massive population movements in Delhi. Azad implored the Muslims of Delhi to remain in India, and attempted to reassure them that India was still their homeland.

During 1948, the last Nizam of Hyderabad, Asaf Jah VII was asked for a donation of 75,000 rupees to repair one-fourth of the mosque floor. The Nizam instead sanctioned 3,00,000 rupees, stating that the remaining three-fourths of the mosque should not look old.

The mosque served as a site of significance with regards to the infamously communal Babri Masjid dispute. Abdullah Bukhari, the Shahi Imam of the Jama Masjid at the time, made several speeches in 1986 regarding the issue from the Masjid, condemning the political support given to the Hindu cause and mobilising Muslim sentiments. In one instance this ignited riots and clashes in Old Delhi. In 1987, Jama Masjid was the staging point for a major peaceful protest regarding the Babri Masjid dispute. On 28 May 1987, amidst rising communal tensions and riots all over India, the Jama Masjid was closed by the Imam and adorned in black cloth, symbolising Muslim resentment of government actions at the time. The decision was highly controversial among Islamic leadership.

 Modern era 

The Jama Masjid serves as Delhi's primary mosque, and has a largely congregational function. The Muslims of the city traditionally gather here to offer communal Friday prayer, as well as for major festivals such as Eid. The mosque is also a major tourist attraction, and derives a significant amount of income through the visits of foreigners.

The function of the mosque as an autonomous political space has continued in the modern era. For example, in 2001 (in the aftermath of the 9/11 attacks) the mosque was a site of protest against U.S bombings in Afghanistan. In 2019, massive protests occurred at the site due to the controversial Citizenship Amendment Act.

 Renovation 

In 2006, it was reported that the mosque was in urgent need of repair, following which the Saudi Arabian king Abdullah offered to pay for it. The Imam said that he had received the offer directly from the Saudi authorities, but requested them to approach the Indian government. However, the Delhi High Court said that this matter had no "legal sanctity" giving no "special equities" to the Imam.

A project aiming to renovate the Jama Masjid and its surroundings has remained unimplemented since the early 2000s, due to several administrative and logistical roadblocks.

 2006 Jama Masjid explosions 

On the 14th of April in 2006, there were two explosions which came soon after Friday prayers and occurred in swift succession. It was unclear how the blasts occurred. Among the casualties, one was in serious condition, whereas eight other people sustained minor injuries. Imam Ahmed Bukhari commented, "there is anger among our people but I am appealing to them to maintain calm".

2010 Jama Masjid attack

On the 15th of September in 2010, two Taiwanese tourists were injured after gunmen on a motorcycle opened fire on a bus parked near gate number three of the mosque. After the attack, the police detained 30 people to question and the area was turned into a fortress because policemen were heavily deployed.

In November 2011, the Delhi Police arrested six members of the Indian Mujahideen who were believed to be behind the Jama Masjid blast along with the Pune German bakery blast. Sources said that the "'main man' Imran" allegedly planted the bomb in a car outside the mosque. In September 2013 it was reported that Yasin Bhatkal, a leader of the group, along with Assadullah Akhtar, were arrested the month before and they admitted that they carried out the attack with the on-the-run Pakistani national Waqas. Yasin said that he was ordered by Karachi-based IM head Riyaz Bhatkal to do the task as the Imam allowed "semi-naked" foreigners inside it.

 Architecture 
The Jama Masjid was built as a part of Shah Jahan's new capital in Delhi, Shahjahanabad. At the time of its construction, it was the largest mosque in the Indian subcontinent. Shah Jahan claimed that the mosque was modelled after the Jama Masjid of Fatehpur Sikri, and this is reflected in the design of many exterior features, such as the facade and courtyard. However, the interior of the mosque more closely resembles the Jama Masjid in Agra. The mosque predominantly uses red sandstone, and is set apart from its predecessors by a more extensive usage of white marble. Black marble also features as a decorative element.Asher, Catherine B. (1992). The New Cambridge History of India: Architecture of Mughal India. Cambridge University Press. p. 250. . Arabic and Persian calligraphic pieces are found on various surfaces of the structure, whose content ranges from religious to panegyric.  

Having been built on a hill, the mosque is situated on a plinth elevated 10 metres above the surrounding city. The complex is oriented to the west, towards Mecca. An imperial college, imperial dispensary, and madrasa used to lie adjacent to the structure, but were destroyed in the uprisings of 1857.    

 Entryways 

The mosque is accessed by three sandstone gates. The most prominent of these is the three-storey high eastern gate, which historically acted as the shahi (royal) entrance, reserved only for the use of the Emperor and his associates. The other two entrances are the northern and southern gates, which are two stories high and were used by the general population. Each gate is accompanied by a three-sided sandstone stairway, with white markings to designate prayer positions. The cabinet located in the north gate has a collection of relics of Muhammad – the Quran written on deerskin, a red beard-hair of the prophet, his sandals and his footprints embedded in a marble block. 

 Courtyard 
The square sahn (courtyard) is paved with red sandstone, and faces the eastern gate. It has a side length of at least 99 m, and can accommodate 25,000 worshippers. In its centre lies a marble ablution tank, measuring 17 m in length and 15 m in width. Open arcades run along the edges of the courtyard, through which the surroundings of the Masjid are visible. Chhatris mark the four corners of the courtyard, rising above the arcades. 

 Prayer Hall 

The prayer hall measures 61 metres in length and 27 metres in breadth. Three marble domes rise up from its roof, featuring golden finials. The facade of the prayer hall features a grand pishtaq in the centre, flanked by five smaller, cusped archways on either side. Above each archway of the prayer hall are some calligraphic pieces. The interior of the hall bears seven mihrabs (prayer niches) on the western qibla wall, corresponding to the seven bays into which the hall is divided. The central mihrab is intricately decorated and clad in marble, with a marble minbar (pulpit) lying to its right. The hall is floored with white and black ornamented marble to look like a Muslim prayer mat.

 Minarets 
The mosque's domes are flanked by two sandstone minarets, at the northeast and southeast corners. They are 40 metres high and longitudinally striped with white marble. Each minaret consists of 130 steps, along which viewing galleries occur at three places. Both minarets are topped with a marble chhatri.

 Shahi Imam 

The Imams of Delhi's Jama Masjid have traditionally been the direct descendants of the first Imam of the Masjid, Syed Abdul Ghafoor Shah Bukhari, who was appointed by Shah Jahan. Their position is known as that of the Shahi Imam, or Royal Imam. The person next-in-line to the position is known as the Naib Imam, or Deputy Imam. The Shahi Imams bear the last name of Bukhari,'' denoting their ancestral origin in Bukhara (of modern day Uzbekistan). The imams who have occupied the position are listed below.

Gallery

See also 
 Badshahi Masjid
 Taj Mahal

Notes

Bibliography

External links 

 

Mosques in Delhi
Mughal mosques
Mosques completed in the 1650s
1656 establishments in India
Archaeological monuments in Delhi
Delhi
Monuments of National Importance in Delhi